Silk Legs is a 1927 American comedy film directed by Arthur Rosson and written by Frances Agnew and Delos Sutherland. The film stars Madge Bellamy, James Hall, Joseph Cawthorn, Maude Fulton and Margaret Seddon. The film was released on December 18, 1927, by Fox Film Corporation.

Cast      
Madge Bellamy as Ruth Stevens
James Hall as Phil Barker
Joseph Cawthorn as Ezra Fulton
Maude Fulton as Mary McGuire
Margaret Seddon as Mrs. Fulton

References

External links
 

1927 films
1920s English-language films
Silent American comedy films
1927 comedy films
Fox Film films
Films directed by Arthur Rosson
American silent feature films
American black-and-white films
1920s American films